These are the results of the women's team all-around competition, one of six events for female competitors in artistic gymnastics at the 1972 Summer Olympics in Munich.  The compulsory and optional rounds took place on August 27 and 28 at the Sports Hall.

The team competition saw the first performance of a standing back somersault on the balance beam, by Soviet gymnast Olga Korbut.

Results
The final score for each team was determined by combining all of the scores earned by the team on each apparatus during the compulsory and optional rounds.  If all six gymnasts on a team performed a routine on a single apparatus during compulsories or optionals, only the five highest scores on that apparatus counted toward the team total.

References

Official Olympic Report
www.gymnasticsresults.com 
www.gymn-forum.net

Women's team all-around
1972 in women's gymnastics
Women's events at the 1972 Summer Olympics